Queen of the Lakes is the unofficial but widely recognized title given to the longest vessel active on the Great Lakes of the United States and Canada. A number of vessels, mostly lake freighters, have been known by the title.

History of name
Queen of the Lakes has been used as the name of three vessels that sailed on the Great Lakes, but none was the longest on the lakes at the time. It was renamed Queen of the Lakes sometime before 1864. She was lost to fire in port on June 17, 1869. While anchored near South Manitou Island she caught fire and burned in 1898. The iron hull was later scrapped.

The title has also been bestowed upon vessels that were especially liked or those considered to be especially beautiful or richly appointed. Such was the case as late as 1949, at which time  was so honored. It has been applied to the United States Coast Guard cutter  for its long and significant role in facilitating Great Lakes shipping and safety. The most common use of the title, however, at least since the early 1940s, is to honor the largest vessel on the lakes. On April 20, 1841, the Detroit Free Press referred to the steamer Illinois as "Queen of the Waters", but given that three vessels in that century were named Queen of the Lakes, its use as a title for the longest ship was not then common. The title is applied retroactively to vessels launched before this use of the title became popular. While some use gross tonnage, capacity, or length between perpendiculars as the criterion, the most commonly accepted standard is length overall (LOA). This article uses LOA as the standard.

Early Queens
The earliest vessels on the Great Lakes were human powered canoes and bateaux. Sources differ as to what vessel qualifies as the first real "ship" on the lakes. Contemporary chroniclers called it both a bark and a brigantine. Le Griffon was soon lost. It was last seen on September 18, 1679 and was lost with all hands. Her final location is unknown. Those who consider Le Griffon to have been the first ship on the lakes—and hence, the first Queen—also consider her to have been the first lost.

Other sources say the first ship was a smaller vessel built by LaSalle at Fort Frontenac beginning in September 1678, for the purpose of conveying supplies and material to Niagara. Expedition journalists called it a brigantine. It departed Fort Frontenac under La Motte's and Louis Hennepin's leadership on November 18, 1678, and arrived at the east bank of the Niagara River on December 6, 1679. Hennepin called this vessel a "great bark." One source says the loss occurred on January 8, 1679. Supplies and extra clothing were lost, but LaSalle and his men rescued material for the ship, dragged them to the mouth of the Niagara, rested a few days in an Indian village, and arrived at the settlement above the falls on January 20. Some say the lost vessel was Frontenac. Historian Francis Parkman says that by 1677, there were already four vessels on Lake Ontario between 25 and 40 tons burthen. He does not say if any of them were named. Tonty's journal indicates that the vessel he and LaSalle used was a 40-ton vessel, but he does not associate a name with it.

Records of ship sizes on the lakes between 1678 and 1816 are rare. According to the Detroit Tribune, the vessels Gladwin, Lady Charlotte, Victory, and Boston were on the lakes in 1766 and Brunswick, Enterprise, and Charity were launched in 1767, 1769, and 1770, respectively, but no dimensions are given. A history of Washington Island in Door County, Wisconsin notes that the schooner Washington, used to supply the fitting out of Fort Howard at the head of Green Bay in 1816, was the longest ship on the lakes at the time, but no details are given.

A succession of Queens
On September 7, 1816, the steamer Frontenac was launched. She was fitted out as both a schooner and a side-wheel steamer and designed for both passenger and freight transport. At  she laid claim to the honor of longest active vessel on the lakes, though she saw service only on Lake Ontario. She was scrapped at Niagara in 1827, and the next verifiable Queen was not launched until 1830.

The chart below identifies the succession of vessels known to qualify as Queen of the Lakes from 1813 to the present. The succession of queens is not known to be continuous before David Dows. Those from Frontenac through City of Buffalo were side-wheel steamships, though Michigan, like Frontenac was dual fitted as an operational schooner. The heyday of the luxurious passenger steamers was waning even as some of them were launched. Mississippi, Plymouth Rock, and Western World were all out of service by 1859, and the Queens that had not already been lost by 1862 were rebuilt as barges or schooners or dismantled within a year. Nebraska was a propeller-driven steamer for freight and passenger use, but given what had happened to her predecessors, she was likely not so richly appointed. In 1904, Nebraska was refitted as a lumber carrier, after which time she resembled a classic bulk carrier. David Dows was a 5-masted schooner used primarily for transporting wheat. Susquehanna, Owego, and Chemung were propeller-driven package freighters. The whaleback  was a celebrated passenger vessel. Onoko and all other vessels from Curry on were or are propeller-driven bulk carriers.

The steamship Quebec, launched in 1865, appears in lists of Great Lakes vessels. At 283 feet, she was longer than both Nebraska and David Dows, but her service was on the St. Lawrence River between Montreal and Quebec, not on the Great Lakes proper. She continued in service for many years and was dismantled in 1938.

Notes

Citations

Sources
 
 Historical Collections of the Great Lakes  Bowling Green State University, Bowling Green, Ohio (BGSU) Accessed February 28, 2011

 
+
Ship names